Chris Nallen (born April 9, 1982) is an American professional golfer.

Nallen was born in Queens, New York but he grew up in Hackettstown, New Jersey. In high school, Nallen went to Blair Academy where he excelled as one of top golfers in the state. He played college golf at the University of Arizona where he won six tournaments and was a four-time All-American. He also won the 2003 Northeast Amateur and the 2004 Dogwood Invitational. He played on the U.S. teams in the 2003 and 2004 Palmer Cups and the 2003 Walker Cup. He was a semi-finalist in 2004 U.S. Amateur. He turned professional after the U.S. Amateur.

In his first pro start, Nallen finished T-49 at the 2004 Buick Championship. In October 2004, he Monday-qualified for the Gila River Classic at Wild Horse Pass Resort on the Nationwide Tour by shooting a round of 63. He shot 60 in the first round and led wire-to-wire for his first pro win. He was the 17th Monday qualifier to win, the 10th player to win in his first career start and the 19th player to lead wire-to-wire. He was the first player to accomplish all three feats simultaneously. He has played on the Nationwide Tour since that win.

Amateur wins
2003 Northeast Amateur
2004 Dogwood Invitational

Professional wins (1)

Nationwide Tour wins (1)

U.S. national team appearances
Amateur
Walker Cup: 2003
Palmer Cup: 2003, 2004

References

External links

Arizona Wildcats profile

American male golfers
Arizona Wildcats men's golfers
PGA Tour golfers
Golfers from New York (state)
Golfers from Arizona
Sportspeople from Queens, New York
Sportspeople from Tucson, Arizona
1982 births
Living people